Hyperaspis octavia is a species of lady beetle in the family Coccinellidae. It is found in North America. It is about 2.5mm long, oval-shaped, and shiny black with pale red-brown spots. The legs are also a paler brown.

References

Further reading

 

Coccinellidae
Articles created by Qbugbot
Beetles described in 1908